The women's race at the 2022 UCI Mountain Bike Marathon World Championships took place in Haderslev on 17 September 2022.

Result 
50 competitors from 21 nations started.46 competitors reached the finish line.

References 

2022 UCI Mountain Bike Marathon World Championships